Diandongosaurus is an extinct genus of eosauropterygian known from the lower Middle Triassic (Anisian age) of Yunnan Province, southwestern China. It is known from the holotype IVPP V 17761, a complete and articulated skeleton with skull, which was found in the middle Triassic Lagerstätte of the Guanling Formation. It was first named by Qing-Hua Shang, Xiao-Chun Wu, Cun Li in 2011 and the type species is Diandongosaurus acutidentatus.

References

Fossil taxa described in 2011
Sauropterygian genera
Triassic sauropterygians
Fossils of China
Anisian life
Guanling Formation